Lysophosphatidylinositol (LPI, lysoPI), or L-α-lysophosphatidylinositol, is an endogenous lysophospholipid and endocannabinoid neurotransmitter. LPI, along with its 2-arachidonoyl- derivative, 2-arachidonoyl lysophosphatidylinositol (2-ALPI), have been proposed as the endogenous ligands of GPR55.

See also
 Phosphatidylinositol
 Cannabinoid receptor

References

Endocannabinoids
Neurotransmitters
Phospholipids